Fan mussel is a common name for several bivalves and may refer to:

Atrina fragilis, native to the northeast Atlantic Ocean and the Mediterranean Sea
Pinna nobilis, native to the Mediterranean Sea

Mollusc common names